Wally the Green Monster is the official mascot for the Boston Red Sox. His name is derived from the Green Monster, the nickname of the 37-foot 2-inch wall in left field at Fenway Park. Wally debuted on April 13, 1997. Although he was an immediate success with children, he was not as well-received by older fans. Wally has since become more accepted by Red Sox fans of all ages, in part due to the late fan-favorite Red Sox broadcaster Jerry Remy creating stories about him and sharing them during televised games.

Fictional biography
According to the Boston Red Sox, Wally has been a long-time resident of Fenway Park, residing in the Green Monster wall since 1947. He wears Red Sox jersey #97, indicating the year of his emergence from the wall, and consistently wears his team-issued size 37 cap.

In his spare time, Wally likes to play catch with the Red Sox players, and read his favorite book "Hello, Wally" written by his good friend and NESN Red Sox Broadcaster Jerry Remy. He also sneaks into the concession stands when no one is looking to grab a bite (or more) to eat. He prepares for every Red Sox game by eating a good meal, watching batting practice, and tuning into Red Sox Pregame as he ties up his shoes and grabs his trusty Red Sox flag.

Role in games
As pregame starts, Wally is on the field greeting fans near field level by taking pictures, signing autographs and sneaking in a kiss or two to the many fans of Red Sox Nation. After photo ops with some of Fenway's special guests of the game, he can be seen waving his flag and cheering on the Red Sox as the starting lineups are announced. After the national anthem is sung, Wally and a guest formally begin the game with the announcement "play ball".

Throughout the game, Wally can be seen making seat visits for some special guests, and jumping up on the dugout to sing "Take Me Out to the Ball Game" during the seventh-inning stretch. On weekends, Wally can be seen out on Jersey Street taking pictures with fans who visit the "street fair atmosphere" of Wally's World around the third inning of the ballgame.

Some of Wally's memorable moments of being the Red Sox mascot have come while away from Fenway. Whether it is traveling to Fort Myers, Florida and jetBlue Park for Red Sox spring training or visiting other cities for special events, Wally is a well-traveled monster. For example, Wally was invited to Washington, D.C. to perform with Smokey Robinson in a tribute to a Red Sox favorite and music legend Neil Diamond (writer/performer of "Sweet Caroline") at the Kennedy Center for Performing Arts. When he was told that President Obama, his family, Mr. Diamond and many other celebrities would be in attendance, Wally knew he could not do it alone. He made some calls and brought 100 members of Red Sox Nation to Washington to perform on stage alongside him. Wally also travels to the Major League Baseball All-Star Game every year to meet up with his furry friends from all over Major League Baseball for various fan-fests, signings and gatherings. In 2019, he also traveled across the pond to London for the first annual MLB London Series.

Wally can be found engaging with fans at Fenway as well as on social media. He has a Twitter, Facebook, Instagram, and TikTok account. His handles are @wally97 or @wallyredsox.

Rivalry

Wally has an ongoing rivalry with Tampa Bay Rays' mascot Raymond. Before the Red Sox play a series in Tampa Bay, Raymond typically pranks either Wally or the visiting broadcast booth where the miniature Wally stays with Remy and Dave O'Brien. Raymond's more publicized stunts have involved running Wally over with a four-wheeler and hanging over 40 miniature Raymond dolls in the visiting broadcasters' booth.

Another rivalry that Wally takes part in is the competition between himself and his Fort Myers Spring Training Counterpart, T.C. Bear of the Minnesota Twins for the All Star Game Mascot Home Run Derby Crown. T.C. Bear got the better of the competition for the first couple years, but Wally struck back in 2011 with a laser-show of his own to bring the crown back to Fenway.

In 2018, reflecting the long-standing Yankees–Red Sox rivalry, Wally's Twitter account showed a video of him blasting the Red Sox victory anthem "Dirty Water" from his radio at Fenway following the Game 4 road victory of the Red Sox at Yankee Stadium. This was a sort of revenge for Aaron Judge playing the Yankees' victory anthem "New York, New York" there following their Game 2 road victory days before. When the Red Sox swept the Yankees earlier in the season, Wally went on the field post-game with a broom, this is also done during home series sweeps against other teams. In 2019, Wally took a photo with Jennifer Lopez, who was engaged to former Yankees player Alex Rodriguez at the time, and tweeted a photo at him. During the 2019 London Series, both Rodriguez and Wally posted a photo to social media accounts of Wally “strangling” Rodriguez.

Facts About Wally

On Kid's Opening Day in 1997, Wally appeared on the field to greet younger fans at Fenway Park and threw the ceremonial first pitch.
Wally plush toys, hats, baseballs, bats and pennants have been given out to young fans at home games. Similarly, the Faneuil Hall Marketplace location of Build-a-Bear Workshop features merchandise related to Wally, who is the first mascot to have a year-round store.
Red Sox broadcaster Jerry Remy has told stories about Wally during Red Sox broadcasts since 2002, although this practice has declined in frequency over the years. A toy version of Wally sitting in a miniature white Adirondack chair was formerly seen at Remy's desk in the broadcast booth, occasionally placed upside down during rallies. Remy has written five books, all published by Mascot Books: Hello Wally, Coast to Coast with Wally the Green Monster, A Season with Wally the Green Monster, Wally the Green Monster and his World Tour, and Wally the Green Monster and His Journey Through Red Sox Nation! A sixth book, Wally the Green Monster and His Journey Through Time, written by former Red Sox player Dustin Pedroia, was published in 2012 to commemorate the 100th anniversary of Fenway Park. 
Wally makes appearances at many of the charities and organizations in which the Red Sox are involved, particularly the Jimmy Fund and the Boys & Girls Clubs of America.
Wally has appeared in two of ESPN's "This is SportsCenter" commercials. In the first, he was operating the TelePrompTer while ESPN anchors Scott Van Pelt and Rich Eisen struggled to read what he had typed. In the second, Red Sox player David Ortiz put on a New York Yankees hat to break it in for Jorge Posada when Wally, walking by, became visibly shocked into dropping his papers and dismissing Ortiz's attempts to explain.
Wally is the only mascot to have a Dunkin' Donuts Coolatta Drink named after him. Blue Raspberry and Orange Coolatta blended together makes the "Wally Coolatta." The combination creates a deep green color identical to Wally's green hue.
Wally was the 2011 All Star Game Mascot Home Run Derby Champion.
Wally was ranked fifth on the New York Post'''s list of the greatest mascots in sports in April 2012.
Wally wore a beard for the World Series victory parade on November 2, 2013, in reference to the long beards grown by many Red Sox players during the postseason that year. He rode on a flatbed truck with members of the band Dropkick Murphys.
It was announced in the winter of 2015-16 that Wally has a little sister, Tessie. She first appeared in public at the Winter Weekend on January 22, 2016.
Wally and Tessie are featured in Wally's Opening Day'', a half-hour animated children's TV special. It premiered on April 2, 2017, and has aired every season since at the beginning of the Red Sox's season. The show deals with Wally missing the Red Sox team bus from Florida to Boston after spring training, and his efforts to return home and prepare the stadium for the Red Sox season-opening home game.

See also
List of Major League Baseball mascots

References

Further reading

External links

Official homepage of the Boston Red Sox
Wally visits the Children's Hospital in Providence, RI

Boston Red Sox
Major League Baseball team mascots
Fictional monsters
Culture of Boston